Poland has a rich selection of gold and silver commemorative coins. In the year 2001 coins were launched in the series: "Monuments of Material Culture in Poland", "Polish kings and princes", "The Animals of the World", "Polish Travelers and Explorers", "The Polish Calendar of Traditional Customs and Rituals" and various occasional coins.

Table of contents

See also

 Numismatics
 Regular issue coinage
 Coin grading

References

Commemorative coins of Poland